This is a list of rivers of the US state of Alabama. Alabama has over 77,000 miles of rivers and streams with more freshwater biodiversity than any other US state. Alabama's rivers are among the most biologically diverse waterways in the world. 38% of North America's fish species, 43% of its freshwater gill-breathing snails, 51% of its freshwater turtle species, and 60% of its freshwater mussel species are native to Alabama's rivers.

List by drainage basin
All rivers in Alabama eventually flow into the Gulf of Mexico. This list arranges rivers into drainage basin, which are ordered by the location of the mouth of the main stem from east to west.  Tributaries are ordered from mouth to source (subject to being within the borders of Alabama).

Gulf Coast (east)
  

Apalachicola River (FL)
Chattahoochee River
Cedar Creek
Omusee Creek
Abbie Creek
Sandy Creek
Cheneyhatchee Creek
Barbour Creek
Chewalla Creek
Cowikee Creek
North Fork Cowikee Creek
Middle Fork Cowikee Creek
South Fork Cowikee Creek
Hatchechubbee Creek
Uchee Creek
Little Uchee Creek
Wacoochee Creek
Halawakee Creek
Osanippa Creek
Oseligee Creek
Wehadkee Creek
Hillabahatchee Creek

Choctawhatchee River
Holmes Creek
Wrights Creek
Pea River
Flat Creek
Eightmile Creek
Whitewater Creek
Double Bridges Creek
Claybank Creek
Little Choctawhatchee River
West Fork Choctawhatchee River
Judy Creek
East Fork Choctawhatchee River

Yellow River
Shoal River (FL)
Pond Creek
Five Runs Creek
Lightwood Knot Creek

Blackwater River (Pensacola Bay)
Big Coldwater Creek
Big Juniper Creek
Sweetwater Creek

Escambia River (FL)
Conecuh River
Big Escambia Creek
Lindsey Creek
Murder Creek
Burnt Corn Creek
Mayo Mill Creek
Silas Creek
Sepulga River
Patsaliga Creek

Perdido River
Blackwater River (Perdido Bay)
Styx River
Cowpen Creek
Hollinger Creek

Soldier Creek
Palmetto Creek
Hammock Creek

Wolf Creek
Miflin Creek
Sandy Creek

Portage Creek

Mobile Bay

Bon Secour River
Magnolia River
Fish River

Blakeley River
Bay Minette Creek

Apalachee River
Conway Creek

Mobile River-Tensaw River
Spanish River
Lower Crab Creek
Raft River
Oak Bayou
Threemile Creek
Chickasaw Creek
Crab Creek
Big Bayou Canot
Bayou Sara
Gunnison Creek
Big Lizard Creek
Little Lizard Creek
Middle River
Cedar Creek
Alabama River
Majors Creek
Limestone Creek (Alabama River tributary)
Big Flat Creek
Robinson Creek
Cane Creek
Bear Creek (Alabama River tributary)
Pursley Creek
Beaver Creek
Goose Creek
Turkey Creek
Dixon Creek
Pine Barren Creek
Bear Creek (Pine Barren Creek tributary)
Sturdivant Creek
Chilatchee Creek
Sand Creek
Bogue Chitto Creek
Bear Creek (Bogue Chitto Creek tributary)
Chaney Creek
Mud Creek
Cedar Creek
Mush Creek
Cahaba River
Oakmulgee Creek
Schultz Creek
Hill Creek
Little Cahaba River (Bibb County, Alabama)
Mahan Creek
Shoal Creek
Shades Creek
Piney Woods Creek
Buck Creek
Patton Creek
Little Cahaba River (Jefferson County, Alabama)
Big Black Creek
Soapstone Creek
Mulberry Creek
Little Mulberry Creek
Benson Creek
Old Town Creek
Big Swamp Creek
Rambo Branch
Ivy Creek
Swift Creek
Tallawassee Creek
Pintlala Creek
Catoma Creek
Autauga Creek
Tallapoosa River
Chubbehatchee Creek
Line Creek (Alabama)
Cubahatchee Creek
Calebee Creek
Uphapee Creek
Hillabee Creek
Enitachopco Creek
Little Hillabee Creek
Harbuck Creek
Emuckfaw Creek
Chatahospee Creek
High Pine Creek
Cornhouse Creek
Crooked Creek
Wesobulga Creek
Little Tallapoosa River
Wedowee Creek
Muscadine Creek
Coosa River
Mortar Creek
Cottonford Creek
Callaway Creek
Weoka Creek
Little Weoka Creek
Chestnut Creek
Hatchet Creek
Weogufka Creek
Swamp Creek
Socapatoy Creek
Walnut Creek
Yellow Leaf Creek
Paint Creek
Waxahatchee Creek
Buxahatchee Creek
Peckerwood Creek
Yellowleaf Creek
Tallaseehatchee Creek (Coosa River tributary)
Shirtee Creek
Emauhee Creek
Talladega Creek
Kelly Creek (Coosa River tributary)
Choccolocco Creek
Cheaha Creek
Kelly Creek (Cheaha Creek tributary)
Cane Creek
Ohatchee Creek
Tallaseehatchee Creek (Ohatchee Creek tributary)
Big Canoe Creek
Big Wills Creek
Terrapin Creek
Hurricane Creek
Nances Creek
Little River
East Fork Little River
West Fork Little River
Chattooga River
Mills Creek
Tombigbee River
West River
Bates Creek
Bilbo Creek
Bassetts Creek (west side Tombigbee River tributary)
Bassett Creek (east side Tombigbee River tributary)
Jackson Creek
Santa Bogue Creek
Dry Creek
Turkey Creek
Okatuppa Creek
Souwilpa Creek
Puss Cuss Creek
Big Tallawampa Creek
Little Tallawampa Creek
Bashi Creek
Wahalak Creek
Sucarbowa Creek
Horse Creek
Tuckabum Creek
Yantley Creek
Bogue Chitto
Beaver Creek
Kinterbish Creek
Chickasaw Bogue
Dry Creek
Cotohaga Creek
Sucarnoochee River
Alamuchee Creek
Spring Creek
Lost Creek
Hall Creek
Black Warrior River
Big Prairie Creek
Big Brush Creek
Minter Creek
Fivemile Creek
Grant Creek
Big Sandy Creek
North River
Hurricane Creek
Davis Creek
Blue Creek
Big Yellow Creek
Valley Creek
Mud Creek
Locust Fork
Short Creek
Village Creek
Fivemile Creek
Turkey Creek
Gurley Creek
Little Warrior River
Blackburn Fork Little Warrior River
Calvert Prong Little Warrior River
Slab Creek
Mulberry Fork
Lost Creek
Wolf Creek
Indian Creek
Cane Creek (Lost Creek tributary)
Mill Creek
Cane Creek (Mulberry Fork)
Blackwater Creek
Sipsey Fork
Ryan Creek
Rock Creek
Crooked Creek
Blevens Creek
Clear Creek
Right Fork Clear Creek
Brushy Creek
Capsey Creek
Rush Creek
Caney Creek
Borden Creek
Broglen River
Eightmile Creek
Duck River
Brush Creek
Trussells Creek
Noxubee River
Bodka Creek
Woodward Creek
Sipsey River
New River
Little New River
Lubbub Creek
Bear Creek (Lubbub Creek tributary)
Big Creek
Luxapallila Creek
Yellow Creek
Buttahatchee River
Sipsey Creek
Bull Mountain Creek
Gum Creek

Dog River
Perch Creek
Alligator Bayou
Rabbit Creek
Rattlesnake Bayou
Halls Mill Creek
Moore Creek
Bolton Branch
Eslava Creek
Robinson Bayou

Middle Fork Deer River
North Fork Deer River

South Fork Deer River

Fowl River
East Fowl River
West Fowl River
Dykes Creek

Gulf Coast (west)
Heron Bayou
Bayou Sullivan
Bayou Coden
Bayou la Batre
Little River

Pascagoula River (MS)
Escatawpa River
Bennett Creek
Little Creek
Pond Creek

Mississippi River

Mississippi River (LA, MS, TN, KY)
Ohio River (KY)
Tennessee River
Bear Creek
Buzzard Roost Creek
Cedar Creek
Little Bear Creek
Second Creek
Mulberry Creek
Cane Creek
Little Bear Creek
Spring Creek
Cypress Creek
Little Cypress Creek
Shoal Creek
Butler Creek
Town Creek
Mud Creek
Bluewater Creek
Big Nance Creek
Clear Fork
Muddy Fork
Second Creek
Elk River
Anderson Creek
Sugar Creek
Sulphur Creek
Big Creek
Flint Creek
West Flint Creek
No Business Creek
Limestone Creek
Piney Creek
Cotaco Creek
Town Creek
Indian Creek
Huntsville Spring Branch
Broglan Branch
Flint River
Hurricane Creek (Flint River tributary)
Brier Fork Flint River
Mountain Fork
Paint Rock River
Hurricane Creek (Paint Rock River tributary)
Estill Fork
Big Spring Creek
Short Creek
Scarham Creek
Town Creek
South Sauty Creek
Kirby Creek
North Sauty Creek
Blue Spring Creek (North Sauty Creek tributary)
Mud Creek
Robinson Creek (Mud Creek tributary)
Coon Creek
Crow Creek
Big Coon Creek
Widows Creek
Long Island Creek (Tennessee River tributary)
Jones Creek
Lookout Creek

Alphabetically

Abbie Creek
Alabama River
Alamuchee Creek
Alligator Bayou
Anderson Creek
Apalachee River
Autauga Creek
Barbour Creek
Bashi Creek
Bassett Creek (east side Tombigbee River tributary)
Bassetts Creek (west side Tombigbee River tributary)
Bates Creek
Bay Minette Creek
Bayou Coden
Bayou la Batre
Bayou Sara
Bayou Sullivan
Bear Creek (Alabama River tributary)
Bear Creek (Bogue Chitto Creek tributary)
Bear Creek (Lubbub Creek tributary)
Bear Creek (Pine Barren Creek tributary)
Bear Creek (Tennessee River tributary)
Beaver Creek (Alabama River tributary)
Beaver Creek (Tombigbee River tributary)
Bennett Creek
Benson Creek
Big Bayou Canot
Big Black Creek
Big Brush Creek
Big Canoe Creek
Big Coldwater Creek
Big Coon Creek
Big Creek
Big Escambia Creek
Big Flat Creek
Big Juniper Creek
Big Lizard Creek
Big Nance Creek
Big Prairie Creek
Big Sandy Creek
Big Spring Creek
Big Swamp Creek
Big Tallawampa Creek
Big Wills Creek
Big Yellow Creek
Bilbo Creek
Black Warrior River
Blackburn Fork Little Warrior River
Blackwater Creek
Blackwater River (Pensacola Bay)
Blackwater River (Perdido Bay)
Blakeley River
Blevens Creek
Blue Creek
Blue Spring Creek (North Sauty Creek tributary)
Bluewater Creek
Bodka Creek
Bogue Chitto (Tuckabum Creek tributary)
Bogue Chitto Creek, Alabama River tributary
Bolton Branch
Bon Secour River
Borden Creek
Brier Fork Flint River
Broglan Branch
Broglen River
Brush Creek
Brushy Creek
Buck Creek
Bull Mountain Creek
Burnt Corn Creek
Butler Creek
Buttahatchee River
Buxahatchee Creek
Buzzard Roost Creek
Cahaba River
Calebee Creek
Callaway Creek
Calvert Prong Little Warrior River
Cane Creek (Alabama River tributary)
Cane Creek (Coosa River tributary)
Cane Creek (Lost Creek tributary)
Cane Creek (Mulberry Fork)
Cane Creek (Tennessee River tributary)
Caney Creek
Capsey Creek
Catoma Creek
Cedar Creek (Alabama River tributary)
Cedar Creek (Bear Creek tributary)
Cedar Creek (Chattahoochee River tributary)
Cedar Creek (Mobile River tributary)
Chaney Creek
Chatahospee Creek
Chattahoochee River
Chattooga River
Cheaha Creek
Cheneyhatchee Creek
Chestnut Creek
Chewalla Creek
Chickasaw Bogue
Chickasaw Creek
Chilatchee Creek
Choccolocco Creek
Choctawhatchee River
Chubbehatchee Creek
Claybank Creek
Clear Creek
Clear Fork (Big Nance Creek tributary)
Conecuh River
Conway Creek
Coon Creek
Coosa River
Cornhouse Creek
Cotaco Creek
Cotohaga Creek
Cottonford Creek
Cowikee Creek
Cowpen Creek
Crab Creek
Crooked Creek (Rock Creek tributary)
Crooked Creek (Tallapoosa River tributary)
Crow Creek
Cubahatchee Creek
Cypress Creek
Davis Creek
Dixon Creek
Dog River
Double Bridges Creek
Dry Creek (Chickasaw Bogue)
Dry Creek (Santa Bogue Creek tributary)
Duck River
Dykes Creek
East Fork Choctawhatchee River
East Fork Little River
East Fowl River
Eightmile Creek (Broglen River tributary)
Eightmile Creek (Flat Creek tributary)
Elk River
Emauhee Creek
Emuckfaw Creek
Enitachopco Creek
Escambia River
Escatawpa River
Eslava Creek
Estill Fork
Fish River
Five Runs Creek
Fivemile Creek (Black Warrior River tributary)
Fivemile Creek (Locust Fork)
Flat Creek
Flint Creek
Flint River
Fowl River
Goose Creek
Grant Creek
Gum Creek
Gunnison Creek
Gurley Creek
Halawakee Creek
Hall Creek
Halls Mill Creek
Hammock Creek
Harbuck Creek
Hatchechubbee Creek
Hatchet Creek
Heron Bayou
High Pine Creek
Hill Creek
Hillabahatchee Creek
Hillabee Creek
Hollinger Creek
Holmes Creek
Horse Creek
Huntsville Spring Branch
Hurricane Creek (Black Warrior River tributary)
Hurricane Creek (Flint River tributary)
Hurricane Creek (Paint Rock River tributary)
Hurricane Creek (Terrapin Creek tributary)
Indian Creek (Tennessee River tributary)
Indian Creek (Wolf Creek tributary)
Ivy Creek
Jackson Creek
Jones Creek
Judy Creek
Kelly Creek (Cheaha Creek tributary)
Kelly Creek (Coosa River tributary)
Kinterbish Creek
Kirby Creek
Lightwood Knot Creek
Limestone Creek
Lindsey Creek
Line Creek (Alabama)
Little Bear Creek (Bear Creek tributary)
Little Bear Creek (Tennessee River tributary)
Little Cahaba River (Bibb County, Alabama)
Little Cahaba River (Jefferson County, Alabama)
Little Choctawhatchee River
Little Creek
Little Cypress Creek
Little Hillabee Creek
Little Lizard Creek
Little Mulberry Creek
Little New River
Little River, Coosa River tributary
Little River (Portersville Bay)
Little Tallapoosa River
Little Tallawampa Creek
Little Uchee Creek
Little Warrior River
Little Weoka Creek
Locust Fork
Long Island Creek (Tennessee River tributary)
Lookout Creek
Lost Creek (Mulberry Fork)
Lost Creek (Spring Creek tributary)
Lower Crab Creek
Lubbub Creek
Luxapallila Creek
Magnolia River
Mahan Creek
Majors Creek
Mayo Mill Creek
Middle Fork Cowikee Creek
Middle Fork Deer River
Middle River
Miflin Creek
Mill Creek
Mills Creek
Minter Creek
Mobile River
Moore Creek
Mortar Creek
Mountain Fork
Mud Creek
Mud Creek (Tennessee River tributary)
Mud Creek (Town Creek tributary)
Mud Creek (Valley Creek tributary)
Muddy Fork
Mulberry Creek (Alabama River tributary)
Mulberry Creek (Tennessee River tributary)
Mulberry Fork
Murder Creek
Muscadine Creek
Mush Creek
Nances Creek
New River
No Business Creek
North Fork Cowikee Creek
North Fork Deer River
North River
North Sauty Creek
Noxubee River
Oak Bayou
Oakmulgee Creek
Ohatchee Creek
Okatuppa Creek
Old Town Creek
Omusee Creek
Osanippa Creek
Oseligee Creek
Paint Creek
Paint Rock River
Palmetto Creek
Patsaliga Creek
Patton Creek
Pea River
Peckerwood Creek
Perch Creek
Perdido River
Pine Barren Creek
Piney Creek
Piney Woods Creek
Pintlala Creek
Pond Creek (Little Creek tributary)
Pond Creek (Shoal River tributary)
Portage Creek
Pursley Creek
Puss Cuss Creek
Rabbit Creek
Raft River
Rambo Branch
Rattlesnake Bayou
Right Fork Clear Creek
Robinson Bayou
Robinson Creek (Mud Creek tributary)
Rock Creek
Rush Creek
Ryan Creek
Sand Creek
Sandy Creek (Abbie Creek tributary)
Sandy Creek (Wolf Creek tributary)
Santa Bogue Creek
Scarham Creek
Schultz Creek
Second Creek (Pickwick Lake)
Second Creek (Wheeler Lake)
Sepulga River
Shades Creek
Shirtee Creek
Shoal Creek (Little Cahaba River tributary)
Shoal Creek (Tennessee River tributary)
Short Creek (Locust Fork)
Short Creek (Tennessee River tributary)
Silas Creek
Sipsey Creek
Sipsey River
Sipsey Fork
Slab Creek
Soapstone Creek
Socapatoy Creek
Soldier Creek
South Fork Cowikee Creek
South Fork Deer River
South Sauty Creek
Souwilpa Creek
Spanish River
Spring Creek (Tennessee River tributary)
Spring Creek (Tombigbee River tributary)
Sturdivant Creek
Styx River
Sucarbowa Creek
Sucarnoochee River
Sugar Creek
Swamp Creek
Sweetwater Creek
Swift Creek
Talladega Creek
Tallapoosa River
Tallaseehatchee Creek (Coosa River tributary)
Tallaseehatchee Creek (Ohatchee Creek tributary)
Tallawassee Creek
Tennessee River
Tensaw River
Terrapin Creek
Threemile Creek
Tombigbee River
Town Creek (Cotaco Creek tributary)
Town Creek (Guntersville Lake)
Town Creek (Wilson Lake)
Trussells Creek
Tuckabum Creek
Turkey Creek (Beaver Creek tributary)
Turkey Creek (Locust Fork)
Turkey Creek (Tombigbee River tributary)
Uchee Creek
Uphapee Creek
Valley Creek
Village Creek
Wacoochee Creek
Wahalak Creek
Walnut Creek
Waxahatchee Creek
Wedowee Creek
Wehadkee Creek
Weogufka Creek
Weoka Creek
Wesobulga Creek
West Flint Creek
West Fork Choctawhatchee River
West Fork Little River
West Fowl River
West River
Whitewater Creek
Wrights Creek
Widows Creek
Wolf Creek (Lost Creek tributary)
Wolf Creek (Perdido Bay)
Woodward Creek
Yantley Creek
Yellow Creek
Yellow Leaf Creek
Yellow River
Yellowleaf Creek

See also

List of rivers in the United States

References
USGS Geographic Names Information Service
USGS Hydrologic Unit Map – State of Alabama (1974)

Alabama

Rivers